Nelson Ruttenberg (April 11, 1893 – September 12, 1959) was a Jewish-American lawyer and politician from New York.

Life 
Ruttenberg was born on April 11, 1893 in Elmira, New York, the son of Benjamin Ruttenberg and Sadie Kurzman.

Ruttenberg attended public school in New York City and graduated from DeWitt Clinton High School. In 1915, he graduated from the New York University School of Law and was admitted to the bar. During World War I, he was a sergeant in the 152nd Depot Brigade in Camp Upton. In 1923, he formed a partnership with his brother Norbert under the firm name Ruttenberg & Ruttenberg.

In 1923, Ruttenberg was elected to the New York State Assembly as a Democrat, representing the New York County 23rd District. He served in the Assembly in 1924. He was Fourth Deputy Police Commissioner from 1927 to 1933, during which time he presided at the disciplinary trials of policemen involved in the Seabury investigations. He resigned from the position in 1933, when he became consul to the State Alcoholic Beverage Control Board. He held that position until 1937, when he retired due to poor health.

Ruttenberg was president of the Jewish National Fund from 1931 to 1933 an administrative committee member of the Zionist Organization of America, Special Deputy Grand Master of the Independent Order Free Sons of Israel, and the organizer of the Young Folks' Democratic League. He was a member of the Elks, the Improved Order of Red Men, the American Legion, the New York County Lawyers' Association, the New York City Bar Association, the Tammany Society, and the Shomrim Society. He was also vice-president of the YMHA of Washington Heights. In 1927, he married Rhea Hornung. They had a son, David A. By the time he died, he was treasurer of the Park Avenue Synagogue.

Ruttenberg died from a heart attack while leaving home on September 12, 1959. He was buried in Mount Carmel Cemetery.

References

External links 

 The Political Graveyard

1893 births
1959 deaths
19th-century American Jews
20th-century American Jews
Jewish American attorneys
Jewish American state legislators in New York (state)
Jewish American military personnel
Politicians from Elmira, New York
DeWitt Clinton High School alumni
New York University School of Law alumni
20th-century American lawyers
Lawyers from New York City
United States Army personnel of World War I
20th-century American politicians
Politicians from Manhattan
Democratic Party members of the New York State Assembly
Burials in New York (state)